The Spring Street Freight House is a historic freight house located at Jeffersonville, Indiana.  It was placed on the National Register of Historic Places in May 2007, after being nominated by the Indiana Department of Transportation.  It is one of the few railhouses built in the 1920s still standing.

It was built by Cleveland, Cincinnati, Chicago and St. Louis Railway (CCC & St. L RR), also known as the Big Four, around 1925. It was built Craftsman-style, and is  stories high. Its foundation and walls are made of wood, and the roof is asphalt shingles. It includes a brick chimney.

After the railroad abandoned it in 1963, R.A. Alms & Sons Feed Wholesalers used it from 1970 to 1975.  In the 1980s a cable company used it.  It is currently unused, but the Ohio River Bridges Project had plans to restore it in 2008 and turn it into its headquarters; as of August 2009 nothing, no renovation had been performed.

The State of Indiana and Indiana Department of Transportation completed an extensive rehabilitation of the building in 2012.

It was placed on the Indiana Register of Historic Sites and Structures and the National Register of Historic Places on March 29, 2007.

Gallery

See also
Big Four Bridge - Another Big Four property that still remains in Jeffersonville

References

Citations

Sources
 
 http://www.kyinbridges.com/NeighborhoodNewsIndianaDowntown.aspx?cGuid=5b9f2284-b00d-43a0-855c-baf5c38a22df

Jeffersonville, Indiana
National Register of Historic Places in Clark County, Indiana
Railway stations on the National Register of Historic Places in Indiana
Railway stations in the United States opened in 1925
Railway freight houses on the National Register of Historic Places
Former New York Central Railroad stations
Buildings and structures in Clark County, Indiana
Railway buildings and structures on the National Register of Historic Places in Indiana
Former railway stations in Indiana